The year 1708 in music involved some significant musical events and new works.

Events
Alessandro Scarlatti returns to Naples from Venice.
Johann Sebastian Bach becomes organist and concert-master at the Weimar court.
Arcangelo Corelli returns to Rome and joins the household of Cardinal Pietro Ottoboni.

Published popular music
Lyra Davidica (hymns)
 Isaac Watts, Hymns and Spiritual Songs

Published classical music
Tomaso Albinoni – 6 Sonate da chiesa, T.So 26–31, Op. 4
 Louis de Caix d'Hervelois – Pièces de viole, Livre 1
Andre Campra – Cantates françoises
Francisco José de Castro – 8 Concertos, Op. 4
Evaristo Felice Dall'Abaco – 12 Violin Sonatas, Op. 1
Pierre Du Mage – Livre d'orgue
Jean-Baptiste Stuck – Cantates françaises Livre II

Classical Music
Johann Sebastian Bach
Gott ist mein König, BWV 71
Lobe den Herrn, meine Seele, BWV 143
Kyrie in F major, BWV 233a
Fantasia and Fugue in C minor, BWV 537
Prelude and Fugue in C major, BWV 545a
Toccata and Fugue in E major, BWV 566 (Authorship disputed)
Fugue on a Theme by Giovanni Legrenzi, BWV 574
Fugue in C minor, BWV 575
Passacaglia in C minor, BWV 582
Heut’ triumphiret Gottes Sohn, BWV 630
Fantasia super 'Jesu, meine Freude''', BWV 713
Suite in A major, BWV 832Praeludium et partita dei tuono terzo, BWV 833
Toccata in D minor, BWV 913
Fugue in C major, BWV 946
 Antonio Maria Bononcini  
 Mentre in placido sonno La presa di Tebe Tutta fiamme e tutta ardore Antonio Caldara – Il martirio di Santa CaterinaHenri Desmarets – Usque quo DomineGeorge Frederic Handel  La Resurrezione (The Resurrection) (oratorio)Aci, Galatea e Polifemo, HWV 72Ah, crudel! nel pianto mio, HWV 78Aminta e Fillide, HWV 83Cuopre tal volta il cielo, HWV 98Dalla guerra amorosa, HWV 102aDitemi, o piante, HWV 107Lungi n'andò Fileno, HWV 128Nel dolce tempo, HWV 135bNell'africane selve, HWV 136Olinto pastore, Tebro fiume, Gloria, HWV 143Quando sperasti, o core, HWV 153Se pari è la tua fè, HWV 158aSento là che ristretto, HWV 161a
Jacques-Martin Hotteterre – Pièces pour la flûte traversiere, Op. 2
Elisabeth Jacquet de la Guerre – Cantates françaises sur des sujets tirés de l’écriture, Livre IBenedetto Marcello – 12 Concerti à 5, Op. 1
Johann Mattheson – 12 Flute Sonatas, Op. 1
Johann Pachelbel An Wasserflüssen Babylon, P. 18Plauener OrgelbuchJames Paisible – The Saltarella. Mr. Isaac's new dance made for Her Majesty's Birthday, 1708...Bernardo Pasquini – Passagaglie and Variation
Alessandro Scarlatti – Oratorio per la Passione di Nostro Signore Gesù CristoGeorg Philipp Telemann – Singet dem Herrn, TWV 1:1748
Antonio Vivaldi 
Cello Concerto in F major, RV 410
Concerto in A major, RV 585
Sonata for Violin, Oboe, Organ, Chalumeau and Continuo, RV 779

Opera
Giovanni Bononcini – Mario fuggitivoAntonio Caldara – Più bel nomeAndré Campra – HippodamieJohann Joseph Fux – Pulcheria, K.303
George Frideric HandelDaphneFlorindo Antonio Literes – Acis y GalateaNicola Porpora – L'Agrippina Births 
January 26 – William Hayes (composer), organist, singer, conductor and composer (died 1777)
February 8 – Václav Jan Kopřiva, composer (died 1789)
February 11 – Egidio Duni, composer of opera comique (died 1775)
February 25 – Felix Benda, composer (died 1768)
April 6 – Georg Reutter II, composer of church music (died 1772)
May 5 – Johann Adolf Scheibe, composer and critic (died 1776) 
June 19 – Johann Gottlieb Janitsch, composer (died 1763)date unknownLavinia Fenton, actress, the original Polly Peachum (died 1760)
Johann Adolph Scheibe, composer (died 1776)
William Tuckey, composer (died 1781)

 Deaths 
April 19 – Angiola Teresa Moratori Scanabecchi, composer and painter (born 1662)
May 13 – Giovanni Battista Draghi, composer and keyboardist (born c.1640)
September 3 – Christian Liebe, organist and composer (born 1654)
October 1 (or January 10) – John Blow, composer (born 1649)date unknown''
Moll Davis, singer (born c. 1648)
Johannes Kelpius, mystic and musician (born 1673)
Thomas Pereira, musician (born 1645)
Bernard Smith, organ maker (born c.1630)

References

 
18th century in music
Music by year